The women's basketball rivalry between the Lady Volunteers of the University of Tennessee and the UConn Huskies of the University of Connecticut is one of the fiercest rivalries in college basketball, and perhaps the only one to reach national consciousness out of the women's game. The matchup features two long-tenured and media savvy coaches generally acknowledged among the top five ever in their sport, over two dozen players who went on to play in the WNBA, and two programs that have combined for 19 national championships. Their head-to-head matchups were consistently the top-rated games in the college women's field.  

Until the 2006-07 season, the two programs met annually in winter at one or both of the schools, but the rivalry is unique for having a third of its games occurring in the women's NCAA tournament. Four times, the national championship has been on the line.

The schools started playing each other in 1995. UConn leads the series 16-9, including 5-2 in the tournament and 4-0 for the title. On the day of every meeting during the rivalry series, both schools have ranked in the top 25 of the Associated Press rankings, until 2023 when Tennessee was not ranked for the first time in the series. 
 
In AP Poll history, Tennessee and UConn have the two longest appearance streaks in women's college basketball. Tennessee had a 565-week run spanning 32 years and UConn currently has a more than 500-week run covering almost 30 years. In addition, UConn has the most No. 1 appearances with 246 with Tennessee in second at 112.

The two schools halted the regular-season series after the 2006-2007 season, and didn't play again for 13 years. The next season, both teams made the 2008 Final Four, but Stanford defeated UConn in the semifinals. Tennessee won the championship.

In 2018, a home and home series was announced with the next meeting at UConn on January 23, 2020. Thirteen years after the series halted, UConn beat Tennessee in the rivalry rematch, 60-45.

The coaches
In its heyday, the rivalry was notable among team sports in that it almost unerringly focused on the sidelines rather than the floor. The two coaches were far and away the best known and best paid in their sport, with both being in the Basketball Hall of Fame and Women's Basketball Hall of Fame. Between them, they account for over 2,000 wins.

On the Tennessee side was Pat Summitt, the all-time winningest NCAA Division I college basketball coach, male or female. Summitt won eight NCAA women's tournaments. She was the acknowledged dean of women's college basketball in the modern era. She was the Naismith College Coach of the Year six times.

On the UConn side is Geno Auriemma, who has won eleven of the last twenty-four NCAA women's tournaments, four at the expense of Summitt in the finals. A media firebrand in the heart of ESPN country, Auriemma has become the most accomplished coach in the last decade, which included a record-breaking 111-game winning streak which began in the fall of 2014 and ended during the Final Four of 2017 NCAA women's tournament. He has seven Naismith awards to Summitt's six.

The two poured gasoline on the fire in press conferences, with Auriemma at one point calling Tennessee the "Evil Empire". The two apparently mended fences after some sparring, as Auriemma noted in his autobiography, Geno.

The games
The two schools first met on January 16, 1995, when televised women's basketball was a rarity. At this high point, with dominant players such as Rebecca Lobo, Kara Wolters and Jennifer Rizzotti, UConn's program was on the rise, beating Tennessee during the regular season and again for the title and an undefeated regular season. They would win another rivalry game in 1996.

The next three years belonged to Summitt, as the Lady Vols won four of the next five meetings with the Huskies en route to three straight national championships. The "Meeks"—Chamique Holdsclaw, Semeka Randall, and Tamika Catchings—and point guard Michelle M. Marciniak powered Tennessee past all rivals, including UConn.

On the horizon, though, were Auriemma's most dominant classes yet, and possibly the strongest lineup ever in the women's game. The starting five of Sue Bird, Asjha Jones, Swin Cash, Tamika Williams, and (for the latter part of the run) Diana Taurasi gave UConn four of the next five national championships. In that run of 2000 to 2004, UConn crushed Tennessee in the rivalry, winning nine of the next eleven meetings, including the 2000, 2003, and 2004 championship games.

In the three seasons after Taurasi went to the WNBA, Summitt rebounded with strong new players like Candace Parker, and won each meeting. UConn's program lacked a dominant scorer like Taurasi, and Tennessee made the most of this vulnerability.

With these results, the rivalry continues to be top-of-mind in the women's game, even years after its discontinuation. A matchup in the 2002 Final Four at the Alamodome in San Antonio was in front of the largest crowd in women's history (29,619). The 2006 regular-season game at Thompson–Boling Arena in Knoxville drew the largest crowd ever for a regular-season women's game (24,653).

After the 2007 game, Auriemma noted that the rivalry, while still intense, lost some of its edge because of increasing parity in the women's game. As an illustration, 2006 was the first time since 1999 that neither UConn nor Tennessee had made the Final Four. He remarked,  "In some sense, a small sense, it's still the Red Sox and the Yankees. It still is. But there's still a lot more good things going on in college basketball now. That's just the reality of it."

Thirteen years after the series ended, the rivalry resumed in 2020, with UConn winning all 4 games through the 2023 season.

Results

Other sports

Football
The rivalry spread into other sports as the two schools agreed to play each other in other matchups. On September 4, 2008, UConn and Tennessee agreed to a home and home series in football for the 2015 and 2016 seasons, but in order to play Virginia Tech at Bristol Motor Speedway in 2016, the series has been postponed.  Furthermore, because of UConn's "Group of Five" status while Tennessee was in the "Power Five," the series may not be held. UConn is set to play Tennessee in Knoxville on November 4, 2023.

Men's basketball
Nearly a year later on July 22, 2009, Huskies men's basketball head coach Jim Calhoun and Vols men's basketball head coach Bruce Pearl agreed to a home and home basketball series in the 2010-2011 and 2011-2012 seasons.  Summitt's son Tyler was on the Volunteers' roster for both games, which the two schools split.

During the 2012-13 season, Tyler Summitt joined Marquette's coaching staff for the women's team, the final year of the pre-split Big East.  The Huskies won against the Golden Eagles in both games.  The Summitt family's rivalry is now at Connecticut 16, Summitts 10—Pat was 9-13 during the rivalry, while Tyler was 1-1 at Tennessee against Connecticut as a men's basketball player, and 0-2 as Marquette's assistant coach.

Notes and references

External links
Series history
Auriemma book excerpt on the rivalry

College basketball rivalries in the United States
UConn Huskies women's basketball
Tennessee Lady Volunteers basketball